Fernando Virgili (Cerreto Sannita, 6 September 1913 – Naples, 2007), first Duke of Castelvenere, is an Italian professor, veteran and artist.

Biography 
Virgili attended technical studies and engineering and was a self-taught artist. A military veteran, Virgili fought in the war in Eastern Africa and in the II World War with the Italian Army, obtaining War Merit Crosses, Military Valour Crosses and some further awards. At the end of the II World War he devoted himself to the education of young people and art.  His artistic works range over a period of about seventy years.

He was honored by the  grant of the hereditary title of Duke of Castelvenere, from the Prince Louis Amoroso of Aragon. 

His works include:  short poems, watercolors and oil paintings, pen and pencil drawings, engraving on glass and on metal, creating models of clocks, wood carving, modeling clay, photography.

References 

1913 births
2007 deaths
20th-century Italian military personnel
Dukes of Italy
Italian military personnel of the Second Italo-Ethiopian War
Italian military personnel of World War II
Italian prisoners of war